Cecil John Abrahams (8 March 1932 – 15 August 2007) was a South African cricketer who played for Western Province in first-class cricket briefly in 1974–75, during a coaching tour, following an invitation from the Western Province Cricket Board. His father was Isaac John Abrahams, in his time dubbed the Prince of Batsmen, and his mother was Lillian May ( Schroeder) Abrahams.

He joined the Lancashire League in 1960. He was trained as a dental technician but the apartheid regime required dental technicians, as people of colour, to work for a white dentist. He resisted this and opened his own private dental lab in Kent Road in Salt River, operating under the radar. In 1960 he was invited to England following the offer of a contract with Milnrow, arranged by Basil D'Oliviera. In Mogamad Allie's cricket history book, More than a game, Allie wrote, "... Abrahams displayed a massive appetite for the game in his new environment, playing for 15 seasons in the Central Lancashire League - first for Milnrow, and later for Radcliffe and Oldham. And although the highpoints were too many to count, his best season was in 1970, when he took 89 wickets at a cost of 10,25 runs per wicket - the best bowling effort in the league that year by a professional". His family joined him in England in 1962, his wife Cynthia, and children John, Jean, Basil, Peter, Noreen and Lynn. Carole, the youngest, would be born in England. His eldest son, John Abrahams, captained the Lancashire county cricket team. His two sons Peter and Basil, regularly played cricket at weekends. He encouraged a number of other Western Province Cricket Board players to join the Lancashire League.

References 

 Mogamad Allie (2000). More than a game: History of the Western Province Cricket Board 1959-1991. The Western Province Cricket Association, Newlands, Cape Town, South Africa

External links
player profile

1932 births
2007 deaths
Cricketers from Cape Town
South African cricketers